Zaire (now called the Democratic Republic of the Congo) competed at the 1988 Summer Olympics in Seoul, South Korea.

Competitors
The following is the list of number of competitors in the Games.

Results by event

Athletics
Men's 10000 metres 
 Kamana Koji 
 First Round — did not finish (→ no ranking)

Men's Marathon
 Kamana Koji — 2:38:34 (→ 73rd place)
 Kaleka Mutoke — 2:55:21 (→ 89th place)

Boxing
Men's Bantamweight (– 54 kg)
 Ibibongo Nduita
 First Round — Defeated Haji Ally (TNZ), 3:2
 Second Round — Lost to Katsuyoki Matsushima (JPN) 0:5

Men's Light Welterweight (– 63.5 kg)
 Kampompo Miango
 First Round — Bye
 Second Round — Disqualified for not showing up at morning weigh-in.

Men's Light Middleweight (– 71 kg)
 Vaban Banko
 First Round — Bye
 Second Round — Lost to Segundo Mercado (ECU), 0:5

Men's Middleweight (– 75 kg)
 Serge Kabongo
 First Round — Defeated James Iahuat (VAN), RSC-1
 Second Round — Lost to Hussain Shah Syed (PAK), 0:5

Men's Light Heavyweight (– 81 kg)
 Rund Kanika
 First Round — Lost to Osmond Imadiyi (NGR), KO-1

Men's Super Heavyweight (+ 91 kg)
 Tshibalabala Kadima
 First Round — Lost to Andreas Schnieders (FRG), RSC-2

References

Official Olympic Reports

External links
 

Nations at the 1988 Summer Olympics
1988